Khetagurov (masculine), Khetagurova (feminine) is the Russian-language rendering of the Ossetian surname Хетӕгкаты, derived from the Ossetian given name Хетӕг, . 
It may also be transliterated as Khatagurov/Khatagurova.
Notable people with the surname include:

Kosta Khetagurov,  national poet of the Ossetian people
Georgy Khetagurov, Ossetian Soviet Army general 
Valentina Khetagurova, Soviet political activist and statesman

Russian-language surnames
Ossetian-language surnames